"Lonely Christmas" is the third single album, and fifth single overall by Crayon Pop. It was released on November 26, 2013 by Chrome Entertainment and Sony Music. The song was a Christmas follow-up to the successful "Bar Bar Bar". Pops in Seoul described it as "a dance song with funk and disco sounds".

Performances
Crayon Pop's comeback stage for "Lonely Christmas" was on Mnet's M! Countdown on December 5, 2013, and promotion continued through the end of the month. Despite being a Christmas song, it was one of the songs performed by Crayon Pop as the opening act of Lady Gaga's ArtRave: The Artpop Ball.

Music video
The music video for "Lonely Christmas" was released on December 1. In this video, Crayon Pop wore outfits that resembled wrapped Christmas gifts, along with the helmets from "Bar Bar Bar", which were decorated with rhinestones and gold stars. The costumes were designed by Gu Donghyun on the OnStyle show, Fashion Killa. In other scenes of the video, Crayon Pop wore green tracksuits. The song's choreography featured a shaky leg dance called the "dog's leg dance". As of October 2014, the music video has more than six million views on YouTube.

Criticism
On November 18, concept photos were released that showed the members wearing Christmas tree themed outfits. After these images were released, Crayon Pop was accused of copying the Christmas tree outfit of Momoka Ariyasu, a member of Japanese girl group Momoiro Clover Z. Chrome Entertainment responded by saying, "It is our first time learning about Momoiro Clover Z's outfit. Since we used the Christmas tree as a concept, it merely looks the same, but it's not plagiarism. Crayon Pop's Christmas tree outfit is simply for the concept photo, not for the stage performances."

After the song was released, it received plagiarism accusations because the introduction sounded similar to the opening theme for the Japanese anime Lupin the Third. Composer Kim Yoo-min responded by saying he had never heard the anime theme song, and the introduction only sounded similar because the two songs were both in the bebop genre.

Track listing

Charts

Singles

Album

Sales and certifications

Release history

References

Songs about loneliness
2013 singles
2013 songs
Korean-language songs
Crayon Pop songs
Christmas songs
Songs involved in plagiarism controversies